The Hebrew Republic, also “De Republica Hebraeorum”, and also “Respublica Hebraeorum”,  is an early modern concept in political theory  in which Christian scholars  regarded the Hebrew Bible as a political constitution framing a perfect and republican government designed by God for the children of Israel.

In 1582, Carlo Sigonio published a text entitled De Republica Hebraeorum. It used the format of the De repubblica Athenensium manual. The question of the political structure in ancient Israel had already been addressed before, but Sigonio was the first to adopt a systematic approach. However, he did not know Hebrew and so used the translation of the Septuagint, giving rise to not a few problems.

Among the most notable works in the genre are “De Republica Hebraeorum” by Petrus Cunaeus    and Eric Nelson's "The Hebrew Republic". A Catholic contributor to the respublica Hebraeorum genre was the Jesuit Giovanni Stefano Menochio, who published his own De republica Hebraeorum in 1648.

References

Further reading 
 
 Lea Campos Boralevi, Classical Foundational Myths of European Republicanism: The Jewish Commonwealth, in Martin van Gelderen and Quentin Skinner, Republicanism: A Shared European Heritage, Cambridge University Press, 2002, p. 258.
 

Political philosophy
Early Modern period